Damiano is a small village outside the town of Giannitsa, in Greece's Pella regional unit. The village, of only about 4 hundred people, is famous for the agricultural regions around it, and its church of Ayios Dimitrios. The village is the birthplace of Elisavet Mystakidou, who won a silver medal in tae kwon do at the Athens 2004 Olympics.

Year

Populated places in Pella (regional unit)